Robert William Thomas Stokes (30 January 1951 – 30 May 1995) was an English footballer, best known for scoring the winning goal in the 83rd minute of the FA Cup Final for Southampton against Manchester United in 1976.

Early career
Stokes was born in Portsmouth on 30 January 1951, and was brought up in the Paulsgrove area of the city. It is ironic that he was born in the city whose team rivals Southampton, the one he was most famous for playing for, although he did go on to play for Portsmouth at the end of his career. Following a successful period of boyhood football at schoolboy and county level, he quickly became a target for a number of clubs and looked likely to sign for Portsmouth. However, he failed a trial with them and instead signed for the Saints in September 1966 as an apprentice, turning professional in February 1968. He struggled to get into the first team as a young player but made his debut on 7 April 1969, scoring against Burnley. However, that was one of only two goals he scored that season and next season (1970–71), ravaged by injury, he only played one game. During the 1971–72 season he played 41 times and scored 7 times. He continued to impress in the next few years, despite suffering relegation in 1974 with the team.

1976: the Cup Final year
The year would be remembered for Saints reaching the FA Cup Final. Stokes had an average league campaign that season, scoring just 8 goals and he nearly left The Dell before the cup final as part of an exchange deal with Portsmouth for Paul Went. However, Stokes changed his mind and stayed. Stokes scored against Blackpool in the fourth round in a 3–1 victory. In the fifth round, Saints were drawn against West Bromwich Albion and were forced to put out a significantly weakened team because of a stomach virus which affected many of the first team. Stokes was not one of the players affected however, and he scored a late equaliser in the game to draw it 1–1. Saints subsequently won the replay and Southampton's place in the final was sealed with a 2–0 semi-final defeat of Crystal Palace.

Southampton faced Football League First Division Manchester United in the final. Stokes scored the only goal of the game, placing his shot accurately into the corner of the net past Alex Stepney in the United goal. Initial thoughts were that he was offside but replays indicate that he was not. The result remains Saints' highest success as a club. He won a new car for scoring the first goal in the cup final; he had apparently started taking driving lessons prior to the final, fully expecting to win the vehicle.

Post-1976
During 1976–77, his final season with Southampton, Stokes made only 11 appearances and scored once. He left Saints with the club still in the Football League Second Division to join their South Coast rivals, and his hometown club, Portsmouth. Just one year after joining them, he left Portsmouth to play for Cheltenham Town.

Stokes next moved over to the US to play for Washington Diplomats. He played alongside fellow imports Jim Steele, his teammate in the 1976 final, Tommy O'Hara, Wim Jansen and Johan Cruyff.

Upon returning to England he later played non-league football with Waterlooville, Cheltenham Town and Chichester City

After football
By 1981, Stokes was running the Manor House pub in Cosham. He took an active interest in horse racing and remained a popular and well respected figure all along the south coast. The pub was not a success though and Stokes took a job in the Harbour View Cafe belonging to his cousin down at The Hard in Portsmouth. In 1994, he was granted a testimonial year by Southampton FC. He died on 30 May 1995, aged 44, after contracting bronchial pneumonia, on the same day as Ted Drake, another footballer who started his professional career at Southampton. He has been honoured by having one of the luxury hospitality suites at the St Mary's Stadium named after him, and Stokes Court, one of the buildings on the site of Southampton's former ground, The Dell.

Honours
Southampton 
 FA Cup winner 1976

References

External links
 NASL stats
Bobby Stokes: The Portsmouth fan who won the FA Cup for Southampton By Lewis Coombes & Adam Williams BBC Sport

1951 births
1995 deaths
People from Paulsgrove
English footballers
Portsmouth F.C. players
Southampton F.C. players
Cheltenham Town F.C. players
North American Soccer League (1968–1984) players
Washington Diplomats (NASL) players
Waterlooville F.C. players
Deaths from bronchopneumonia
Deaths from pneumonia in England
Association football forwards
English expatriate sportspeople in the United States
Expatriate soccer players in the United States
English expatriate footballers
FA Cup Final players